"Two Weeks" is a song by American metal band All That Remains. It was released as the second single from their fourth album, Overcome, on September 18, 2008, and a music video was released to television on October 4, 2008. In the U.S., it peaked at number 9 on the Mainstream Rock Tracks chart and at number 38 on the Modern Rock Tracks chart. It was a free playable download on the iPhone OS game, Tap Tap Revenge 2. It was also a downloadable Rock Band song, along with "This Calling" and "Chiron". The single was certified platinum by the Recording Industry Association of America (RIAA) on November 16, 2022, for selling over 1,000,000 copies in the United States.

Track listing

Charts

Certifications

References

2008 singles
2008 songs
All That Remains (band) songs
Songs written by Jason Costa
Songs written by Philip Labonte